The CEI Free Spirit Mk II, also called the Cabrinha Free Spirit Mark II and the Cabrinha Model 423, is a three-seat American homebuilt aircraft that was designed by Richard Cabrinha and produced by CEI of Auburn, California, introduced at AirVenture in 1995. The aircraft was intended to be supplied as a kit for amateur construction, but only prototypes seem to have been completed.

Design and development
The design goals of the Free Spirit Mk II included long range, high speed and a high rate of climb. The aircraft features a cantilever low-wing, a two-seats-in-side-by-side configuration, plus a jump seat in an enclosed cockpit, retractable tricycle landing gear and a single engine in tractor configuration.

The aircraft is made from lightweight pre-molded composites.

Operational history
In 1998 the company reported that two aircraft were flying, but by December 2013 only one example remained registered in the United States with the Federal Aviation Administration.

Specifications (Free Spirit Mk II)

References

External links
 Photo of the prototype Free Spirit Mark II at AirVenture Oshkosh, 1995

Free Spirit Mk II
1990s United States sport aircraft
1990s United States civil utility aircraft
Single-engined tractor aircraft
Low-wing aircraft
Homebuilt aircraft